The 2019 World Junior A Challenge was an international Junior "A" ice hockey tournament organized by Hockey Canada. It was hosted in Dawson Creek, British Columbia, from December 7–15, 2019, at the EnCana Events Centre.

Preliminary round
All times are local (UTC-7).

Playoff round

Bracket

Semifinals

Bronze medal game

Gold medal game

Awards
MVP:  Devon Levi
All-Star Team
Goaltender:  Yegor Guskov
Defencemen:  Philippe Chapleau /  Daniil Chayka
Forwards:  Brendan Brisson /  Gunnarwolfe Fontaine /  Ryland Mosley

References

External links
Hockey Canada's 2019 WJAC Website

World Junior A Challenge
World Junior A Challenge
World Junior A Challenge
Ice hockey in British Columbia